Below is the list of populated places in Çorum Province, Turkey by the districts. In the following lists, first place in each list is the administrative center of the district.

Çorum

 Çorum
Abdalata, Çorum
Acıpınar, Çorum
Ahiilyas, Çorum
Ahmediye, Çorum
Ahmetoğlan, Çorum
Akçakaya, Çorum
Aksungur, Çorum
Akyazı, Çorum
Altınbaş, Çorum
Arpalık, Çorum
Arpaöz, Çorum
Arslan, Çorum
Aşağısaraylı, Çorum
Atçalı, Çorum
Ayaz, Çorum
Ayvalı, Çorum
Babaoğlu, Çorum
Balımsultan, Çorum
Balıyakup, Çorum
Bayat, Çorum district
Bektaşoğlu, Çorum
Beydili, Çorum
Boğabağı, Çorum
Boğacık, Çorum
Boğazönü, Çorum
Bozboğa, Çorum
Budakören, Çorum
Büğdüz, Çorum
Büğet, Çorum
Büğrüoğlu, Çorum
Burun, Çorum
Büyükdivan, Çorum
Büyükgülücek, Çorum
Çağşak, Çorum
Çakır, Çorum
Çalıca, Çorum
Çalkışla, Çorum
Çaltıcak, Çorum
Çalyayla, Çorum
Çanakçı, Çorum
Çatak, Çorum
Çayhatap, Çorum
Celilkırı, Çorum
Cerit Köyü, Çorum
Çeşmeören, Çorum
Çıkrık, Çorum
Çobandivan, Çorum
Çomarbaşı, Çorum
Çorak Köyü, Çorum
Çukurören, Çorum
Dağkarapınar, Çorum
Değirmendere, Çorum
Delibekiroğlu, Çorum
Deliler, Çorum
Deniz, Çorum
Dere, Çorum
Düdüklük, Çorum
Dut, Çorum
Dutçakallı, Çorum
Düvenci, Çorum
Elicek, Çorum
Elköy, Çorum
Elmalı, Çorum
Erdek, Çorum
Ertuğrul, Çorum
Esençay, Çorum
Eskice, Çorum
Eskiekin, Çorum
Eskikaradona, Çorum
Eskiköy, Çorum
Eskiören, Çorum
Evcikuzkışla, Çorum
Evciortakışla, Çorum
Evciyenikışla, Çorum
Eyerci, Çorum
Eymir, Çorum
Feruz, Çorum
Gemet, Çorum
Göcenovacığı, Çorum
Gökçepınar, Çorum
Gökdere, Çorum
Gökköy, Çorum
Güney, Çorum
Güveçli, Çorum
Güvenli, Çorum
Güzelyurt, Çorum
Hacıahmetderesi, Çorum
Hacıbey, Çorum
Hacımusa, Çorum
Hacıpaşa, Çorum
Hamamlıçay, Çorum
Hamdiköy, Çorum
Hankozlusu, Çorum
Harmancık, Çorum
Hımıroğlu, Çorum
Hızırdede, Çorum
İğdeli, Çorum
İnalözü, Çorum
İsmailköy, Çorum
Kadıderesi, Çorum
Kadıkırı, Çorum
Kalehisar, Çorum
Karaağaç, Çorum
Karabayır, Çorum
Karabürçek, Çorum
Karaca, Çorum
Karacaören, Çorum
Karadona, Çorum
Karagöz, Çorum
Karahisar, Çorum
Karakeçili, Çorum
Karapınar, Çorum
Kavacık, Çorum
Kayı, Çorum
Kazıklıkaya, Çorum
Kertme, Çorum
Kılıçören, Çorum
Kınık, Çorum
Kınıkdeliler, Çorum
Kiranlık, Çorum
Kirazlıpınar, Çorum
Kireçocağı, Çorum
Kırkdilim, Çorum
Kızılpınar, Çorum
Konaklı, Çorum
Köprüalan, Çorum
Kozluca, Çorum
Küçükdüvenci, Çorum
Küçükgülücek, Çorum
Küçükpalabıyık, Çorum
Kultak, Çorum
Kumçeltiği, Çorum
Kuruçay, Çorum
Kuşsaray, Çorum
Kutluca, Çorum
Laloğlu, Çorum
Mecidiyekavak, Çorum
Mislerovacığı, Çorum
Mollahasan, Çorum
Morsümbül, Çorum
Mühürler, Çorum
Mustafaçelebi, Çorum
Narlık, Çorum
Öksüzler, Çorum
Ömerbey, Çorum
Örencik, Çorum
Osmaniye, Çorum
Ovasaray, Çorum
Oymaağaç, Çorum
Palabıyık, Çorum
Pancarlık, Çorum
Paşa, Çorum
Pembecik, Çorum
Pınarçay, Çorum
Pınarcık, Çorum
Şahinkaya, Çorum
Salur, Çorum
Şanlıosman, Çorum
Sapa, Çorum
Saraylı, Çorum
Sarıkaya, Çorum
Sarılık, Çorum
Sarımbey, Çorum
Sarışeyh, Çorum
Sarmaşa, Çorum
Sazak, Çorum
Sazdeğirmeni, Çorum
Şekerbey, Çorum
Şendere, Çorum
Serban, Çorum
Serpin, Çorum
Sevindikalanı, Çorum
Seydim, Çorum
Seydimçakallı, Çorum
Seyfe, Çorum
Şeyhhamza, Çorum
Şeyhmustafa, Çorum
Sırıklı, Çorum
Soğuksu, Çorum
Tarhan, Çorum
Tarhankozlusu, Çorum
Taşpınar, Çorum
Tatar, Çorum
Teslim, Çorum
Tolamehmet, Çorum
Tozluburun, Çorum
Turgut, Çorum
Türkayşe, Çorum
Türkler, Çorum
Üçköy, Çorum
Uğrak, Çorum
Ülkenpınarı, Çorum
Üyük, Çorum
Yakuparpa, Çorum
Yaydiğin, Çorum
Yenice, Çorum
Yenihayat, Çorum
Yenikaradona, Çorum
Yeşildere, Çorum
Yeşilyayla, Çorum

Alaca

Alaca
Akçaköy, Alaca
Akçiçek, Alaca
Akören, Alaca
Akpınar, Alaca
Alacahöyük, Alaca
Altıntaş, Alaca
Bahçeli, Alaca
Balçıkhisar, Alaca
Belpınar, Alaca
Beşiktepe, Alaca
Boğaziçi, Alaca
Bolatçık, Alaca
Bozdoğan, Alaca
Büyükcamili, Alaca
Büyükdona, Alaca
Büyükhırka, Alaca
Büyükkeşlik, Alaca
Büyüksöğütözü, Alaca
Çal, Alaca
Çatak, Alaca
Çatalbaş, Alaca
Çatalkaya, Alaca
Çelebibağ, Alaca
Çetederesi, Alaca
Çevreli, Alaca
Çikhasan, Alaca
Çırçır, Alaca
Çöplü, Alaca
Çöplüavutmuş, Alaca
Çopraşık, Alaca
Dedepınar, Alaca
Değirmendere, Alaca
Değirmenönü, Alaca
Dereyazıcı, Alaca
Eren, Alaca
Eskiyapar, Alaca
Evci, Alaca
Fakılar, Alaca
Gazipaşa, Alaca
Gerdekkaya, Alaca
Geven, Alaca
Gökören, Alaca
Gülderesi, Alaca
Harhar, Alaca
Haydar, Alaca
İbrahim, Alaca
İsahacı, Alaca
İsmailli, Alaca
Kalecikkaya, Alaca
Kapaklı, Alaca
Karaçal, Alaca
Karatepe, Alaca
Kargın, Alaca
Karnıkara, Alaca
Kayabüvet, Alaca
Kıcılı, Alaca
Kılavuz, Alaca
Killik, Alaca
Kızıllı, Alaca
Kızılyar, Alaca
Kızkaraca, Alaca
Koçhisar, Alaca
Körpınar, Alaca
Koyunoğlu, Alaca
Küçükcamili, Alaca
Küçükhırka, Alaca
Küçükkeşlik, Alaca
Külah, Alaca
Küre, Alaca
Kürkçü, Alaca
Kuyluş, Alaca
Kuyumcusaray, Alaca
Kuzkışla, Alaca
Mahmudiye, Alaca
Mazıbaşı, Alaca
Miyanesultan, Alaca
Onbaşılar, Alaca
Örükaya, Alaca
Perçem, Alaca
Sancı, Alaca
Sarısüleyman, Alaca
Seyitnizam, Alaca
Sincan, Alaca
Soğucak, Alaca
Sultan, Alaca
Suludere, Alaca
Tahirabat, Alaca
Tevfikiye, Alaca
Tutaş, Alaca
Tutluca, Alaca
Ünalan, Alaca
Yatankavak, Alaca
Yenice, Alaca
Yeniköy, Alaca
Yeşilyurt, Alaca
Yüksekyayla, Alaca

Bayat

 Bayat
 Ahacık, Bayat
 Aşağı Emirhalil, Bayat
 Ayvalıca, Bayat
 Barak, Bayat
 Bayan, Bayat
 Belören, Bayat
 Beydili, Bayat
 Çamlıgüney, Bayat
 Çayköy, Bayat
 Çerkeş, Bayat
 Cevizli, Bayat
 Çukuröz, Bayat
 Demirciler, Bayat
 Derekutuğun, Bayat
 Dorukseki, Bayat
 Emirhalil, Bayat
 Emirşah, Bayat
 Eskialibey, Bayat
 Evci, Bayat
 Falı, Bayat
 Hacıbayram, Bayat
 İleği, Bayat
 İshaklı, Bayat
 Kalınpelit, Bayat
 Karakaya, Bayat
 Köpüklü, Bayat
 Kubbedin, Bayat
 Kunduzlu, Bayat
 Kuruçay, Bayat
 Sağpazar, Bayat
 Saray, Bayat
 Tepekutuğun, Bayat
 Tevekli, Bayat
 Toyhane, Bayat
 Yeniköy, Bayat
 Yenişıhlar, Bayat
 Yeşilçat, Bayat
 Yoncalı, Bayat

Boğazkale

 Boğazkale
 Emirler, Boğazkale
 Evci, Boğazkale
 Gölpınarlar, Boğazkale
 Kadılıtürk, Boğazkale
 Karakeçili, Boğazkale
 Kaymaz, Boğazkale
 Örenkaya, Boğazkale
 Sarıçiçek, Boğazkale
 Yanıcak, Boğazkale
 Yazır, Boğazkale
 Yekbas, Boğazkale
 Yenikadılı, Boğazkale
 Yukarıfındıklı, Boğazkale

Dodurga

 Dodurga
 Akkaya, Dodurga
 Alpagut, Dodurga
 Ayvaköy, Dodurga
 Berkköy, Dodurga
 Çiftlikköy, Dodurga
 Dikenli, Dodurga
 Kirenci, Dodurga
 Kuyucak, Dodurga
 Mehmetdedeobruğu, Dodurga
 Mehmetdedetekkesi, Dodurga
 Tutuş, Dodurga
 Yeniköy, Dodurga

İskilip

 İskilip
 Ahlatcık, İskilip
 Ahmetce, İskilip
 Akcasu, İskilip
 Akpınar, İskilip
 Aluç, İskilip
 Aşağıörenseki, İskilip
 Aşağışeyhler, İskilip
 Asarcık, İskilip
 Avhatyaka, İskilip
 Başmakcı, İskilip
 Beyoğlan, İskilip
 Çatkara, İskilip
 Çavuşoğlu, İskilip
 Çetmi, İskilip
 Çomu, İskilip
 Çukurköy, İskilip
 Dağkıyısı, İskilip
 Derekarkın, İskilip
 Dereseki, İskilip
 Doğangir, İskilip
 Elmalı, İskilip
 Eskiköy, İskilip
 Göl, İskilip
 Güneyaluç, İskilip
 Hacıhalil, İskilip
 Hallı, İskilip
 Harun, İskilip
 İbik, İskilip
 İkikise, İskilip
 İkipınar, İskilip
 Karaağaç, İskilip
 Karaburun, İskilip
 Karaçukur, İskilip
 Karagöz, İskilip
 Karlık, İskilip
 Karmış, İskilip
 Kavak, İskilip
 Kayaağzı, İskilip
 Kılıçdere, İskilip
 Kızılcabayır, İskilip
 Kurusaray, İskilip
 Kutluözü, İskilip
 Kuz Köyü, İskilip
 Kuzuluk, İskilip
 Musular, İskilip
 Onaç, İskilip
 Örübağ, İskilip
 Saraycık, İskilip
 Sarıkavak, İskilip
 Şehirkuruçay, İskilip
 Seki, İskilip
 Şeyh, İskilip
 Seyirçay, İskilip
 Soğucak, İskilip
 Sorkun, İskilip
 Suhilan, İskilip
 Yalak, İskilip
 Yalakçay, İskilip
 Yanoğlan, İskilip
 Yavu, İskilip
 Yaylacıkseki, İskilip
 Yenice, İskilip
 Yerli, İskilip
 Yukarıörenseki, İskilip

Kargı

 Kargı
 Abdullah, Kargı
 Akçataş, Kargı
 Akkaya, Kargı
 Akkise, Kargı
 Alioğlu, Kargı
 Arık, Kargı
 Avşar, Kargı
 Bademce, Kargı
 Bağözü, Kargı
 Başköy, Kargı
 Bayat, Kargı
 Beygircioğlu, Kargı
 Bozarmut, Kargı
 Çakırlar, Kargı
 Çal, Kargı
 Çeltiközü, Kargı
 Çetmi, Kargı
 Cihadiye, Kargı
 Çobankaya, Kargı
 Çobanlar, Kargı
 Çukuraluç, Kargı
 Demirören, Kargı
 Dereköy, Kargı
 Gökbudak, Kargı
 Gökçedoğan, Kargı
 Göl, Kargı
 Gölet, Kargı
 Göletdere, Kargı
 Gümüşoğlu, Kargı
 Güney, Kargı
 Günyazı, Kargı
 Hacıhamza, Kargı
 Hacıveli, Kargı
 Halılar, Kargı
 İnceçay, Kargı
 Kabakcı, Kargı
 Karaboya, Kargı
 Karacaoğlan, Kargı
 Karakise, Kargı
 Karaosmanlı, Kargı
 Karapürçek, Kargı
 Kavakçayı, Kargı
 Köprübaşı, Kargı
 Koyunkıran, Kargı
 Maksutlu, Kargı
 Örencik, Kargı
 Pelitcik, Kargı
 Pelitözü, Kargı
 Saraçlar, Kargı
 Saraycık, Kargı
 Seki, Kargı
 Sinanözü, Kargı
 Sünlük, Kargı
 Tepelice, Kargı
 Uğuz, Kargı
 Uzunyurt, Kargı
 Yağcılar, Kargı
 Yeşilköy, Kargı

Laçin

 Laçin
 Çamlıca, Laçin
 Çamlıpınar, Laçin
 Doğanlar, Laçin
 Gökçekaya, Laçin
 Gökgözler, Laçin
 Gözübüyük, Laçin
 İkizce, Laçin
 Karasoku, Laçin
 Kavaklıçiftlik, Laçin
 Kuyumcu, Laçin
 Narlı, Laçin
 Sıtma, Laçin
 Yeşilpınar, Laçin

Mecitözü

 Mecitözü
 Ağcakoyun, Mecitözü
 Akpınar, Mecitözü
 Alancık, Mecitözü
 Alören, Mecitözü
 Aşağıkörücek, Mecitözü
 Bayındır, Mecitözü
 Bekişler, Mecitözü
 Beyözü, Mecitözü
 Boğazkaya, Mecitözü
 Boyacı, Mecitözü
 Bükse, Mecitözü
 Çayköy, Mecitözü
 Çitli, Mecitözü
 Dağsaray, Mecitözü
 Devletoğlan, Mecitözü
 Doğla, Mecitözü
 Elmapınar, Mecitözü
 Elvançelebi, Mecitözü
 Emirbağı, Mecitözü
 Fakıahmet, Mecitözü
 Figani, Mecitözü
 Fındıklı, Mecitözü
 Geykoca, Mecitözü
 Gökçebel, Mecitözü
 Güngörmez, Mecitözü
 Hisarkavak, Mecitözü
 İbek, Mecitözü
 Işıklı, Mecitözü
 Kalecik, Mecitözü
 Karacaören, Mecitözü
 Karacuma, Mecitözü
 Kargı, Mecitözü
 Kayı, Mecitözü
 Kışlacık, Mecitözü
 Konaç, Mecitözü
 Köprübaşı, Mecitözü
 Körücek, Mecitözü
 Köseeyüp, Mecitözü
 Koyunağılı, Mecitözü
 Kozören, Mecitözü
 Kuyucak, Mecitözü
 Pınarbaşı, Mecitözü
 Sarıhasan, Mecitözü
 Sırçalı, Mecitözü
 Söğütönü, Mecitözü
 Söğütyol, Mecitözü
 Sorkoğlan, Mecitözü
 Sülüklü, Mecitözü
 Tanrıvermiş, Mecitözü
 Terken, Mecitözü
 Totali, Mecitözü
 Vakıflar, Mecitözü
 Yedigöz, Mecitözü
 Yeşilova, Mecitözü

Oğuzlar

 Oğuzlar
 Ağaççamı, Oğuzlar
 Asarçayı, Oğuzlar
 Cevizli, Oğuzlar
 Derinöz, Oğuzlar
 Erenler, Oğuzlar
 Kayı, Oğuzlar
 Şaphane, Oğuzlar

Ortaköy

 Ortaköy
 Asar, Ortaköy
 Aşdağul, Ortaköy
 Büyükkışla, Ortaköy
 Cevizli, Ortaköy
 Esentepe, Ortaköy
 Fındıklı, Ortaköy
 İncesu, Ortaköy
 Karahacip, Ortaköy
 Kavakalan, Ortaköy
 Kızılhamza, Ortaköy
 Oruçpınar, Ortaköy
 Salbaş, Ortaköy
 Senemoğlu, Ortaköy
 Yaylacık, Ortaköy
 Yukarı Kuyucak, Ortaköy

Osmancık

 Osmancık
 Ağıroğlan, Osmancık
 Akören, Osmancık
 Alibey, Osmancık
 Ardıç, Osmancık
 Aşağızeytin, Osmancık
 Aşıkbükü, Osmancık
 Avlağı, Osmancık
 Aydın, Osmancık
 Baldıran, Osmancık
 Baltacımehmetpaşa, Osmancık
 Başpınar, Osmancık
 Belkavak, Osmancık
 Çampınar, Osmancık
 Çatak, Osmancık
 Çayır, Osmancık
 Danişment, Osmancık
 Deller, Osmancık
 Doğan, Osmancık
 Durucasu, Osmancık
 Evlik, Osmancık
 Fındıcak, Osmancık
 Fındık, Osmancık
 Gecek, Osmancık
 Girinoğlan, Osmancık
 Gökdere, Osmancık
 Güneşören, Osmancık
 Güvercinlik, Osmancık
 Hanefi, Osmancık
 İnal, Osmancık
 İncesu, Osmancık
 Kamil, Osmancık
 Karaçay, Osmancık
 Karaköy, Osmancık
 Karalargüney, Osmancık
 Kargı, Osmancık
 Kızıltepe, Osmancık
 Konaca, Osmancık
 Kumbaba, Osmancık
 Kuzalibey, Osmancık
 Kuzhayat, Osmancık
 Öbektaş, Osmancık
 Ovacıksuyu, Osmancık
 Pelitçik, Osmancık
 Sarıalan, Osmancık
 Sarpunkavak, Osmancık
 Seki, Osmancık
 Sekibağı, Osmancık
 Sütlüce, Osmancık
 Tekmen, Osmancık
 Tepeyolaltı, Osmancık
 Umaç, Osmancık
 Yağsüzen, Osmancık
 Yaylabaşı, Osmancık
 Yenidanişment, Osmancık
 Yukarızeytin, Osmancık

Sungurlu

 Sungurlu
 Akçakoyunlu, Sungurlu
 Akçalı, Sungurlu
 Akdere, Sungurlu
 Akpınar, Sungurlu
 Alembeyli, Sungurlu
 Arabaçayı, Sungurlu
 Arıcı, Sungurlu
 Arifegazili, Sungurlu
 Aşağıbeşpınar, Sungurlu
 Aşağıfındıklı, Sungurlu
 Asayiş, Sungurlu
 Ayağıbüyük, Sungurlu
 Aydoğan, Sungurlu
 Bağcılı, Sungurlu
 Bağdatlı, Sungurlu
 Bahşılı, Sungurlu
 Balkaya, Sungurlu
 Beşdam, Sungurlu
 Beşkız, Sungurlu
 Beylice, Sungurlu
 Beyyurdu, Sungurlu
 Boztepe, Sungurlu
 Bozyayla, Sungurlu
 Bunalan, Sungurlu
 Büyükincesu, Sungurlu
 Büyükpolatlı, Sungurlu
 Çamoluk, Sungurlu
 Çavuşçu, Sungurlu
 Çavuşköy, Sungurlu
 Çayan, Sungurlu
 Çayyaka, Sungurlu
 Cevheri, Sungurlu
 Çiçekli, Sungurlu
 Çiçeklikeller, Sungurlu
 Çiftlikköy, Sungurlu
 Çingiller, Sungurlu
 Çukurlu, Sungurlu
 Çulhalı, Sungurlu
 Dayıncık, Sungurlu
 Demirşeyh, Sungurlu
 Denizli, Sungurlu
 Derekışla, Sungurlu
 Dertli, Sungurlu
 Ekmekçi, Sungurlu
 Eşme, Sungurlu
 Gafurlu, Sungurlu
 Gökçam, Sungurlu
 Gökçeköy, Sungurlu
 Göller, Sungurlu
 Güvendik, Sungurlu
 Hacıosman, Sungurlu
 Hilallı, Sungurlu
 İkizli, Sungurlu
 İmirli, Sungurlu
 İnegazili, Sungurlu
 Kaledere, Sungurlu
 Kalenderoğlu, Sungurlu
 Kamışlı, Sungurlu
 Karacabey, Sungurlu
 Karaçay, Sungurlu
 Karakaya, Sungurlu
 Karakocalı, Sungurlu
 Karaoğlu, Sungurlu
 Kavşut, Sungurlu
 Kemalli, Sungurlu
 Kertme, Sungurlu
 Kırankışla, Sungurlu
 Kışlaköy, Sungurlu
 Körkü, Sungurlu
 Küçükincesu, Sungurlu
 Küçükpolatlı, Sungurlu
 Kula, Sungurlu
 Kurbağlı, Sungurlu
 Kuşçalı, Sungurlu
 Kuzucak, Sungurlu
 Mahmatlı, Sungurlu
 Mehmetaliçiftliği, Sungurlu
 Mehmetbeyli, Sungurlu
 Muratkolu, Sungurlu
 Oğlaközü, Sungurlu
 Ortakışla, Sungurlu
 Ortaköy, Sungurlu
 Oyaca, Sungurlu
 Salmanköy, Sungurlu
 Saraycık, Sungurlu
 Sarıcalar, Sungurlu
 Sarıkaya, Sungurlu
 Şekerhacılı, Sungurlu
 Tatlı, Sungurlu
 Tatlısu, Sungurlu
 Terzili, Sungurlu
 Tokullu, Sungurlu
 Topuz, Sungurlu
 Tuğcu, Sungurlu
 Tuğlu, Sungurlu
 Turgutlu, Sungurlu
 Türkhacılarhanı, Sungurlu
 Üçoluk, Sungurlu
 Yarımsöğüt, Sungurlu
 Yenihacılarhanı, Sungurlu
 Yeşilova, Sungurlu
 Yeşilyurt, Sungurlu
 Yirce, Sungurlu
 Yorgalı, Sungurlu
 Yörüklü, Sungurlu
 Yukarıbeşpınar, Sungurlu

Uğurludağ

 Uğurludağ
 Anbarcı, Uğurludağ
 Aşılıarmut, Uğurludağ
 Boztepe, Uğurludağ
 Büyükerikli, Uğurludağ
 Dağönü, Uğurludağ
 Eskiçeltek, Uğurludağ
 Gökçeağaç, Uğurludağ
 Karaevliya, Uğurludağ
 Karakısık, Uğurludağ
 Kırköy, Uğurludağ
 Kızağlı, Uğurludağ
 Köpeç, Uğurludağ
 Küçükerikli, Uğurludağ
 Resuloğlu, Uğurludağ
 Sazköy, Uğurludağ
 Torunlar, Uğurludağ
 Üçdam, Uğurludağ
 Yarımca, Uğurludağ
 Yeniyapan, Uğurludağ

References

List
Corum